This article is about the history of Nottingham.

Pre-history
The middle Trent Valley was covered by ice sheets for large parts of the Paleolithic period between 500,000 and 10,000 years ago, and evidence of early human activity is limited to a small number of discarded stone artefacts found in glacial outwash or boulder clays. The post-glacial warming of the climate in the Mesolithic period between 10,000BC and 4,000BC saw the Trent Valley colonised by hunter-gatherers taking advantage of the emerging mixed woodland environment. Flintwork dating from the period has been excavated on the site of Nottingham Castle, and stone tools used by hunter-gatherers have been found in areas of the city including Beeston, Wollaton Park and the site of the Victoria Centre. The Neolithic period between 4,000BC and 2,000BC saw the clearance of woodland and the transition of the area towards a settled agricultural society. Pottery from the period has been found in Attenborough and Holme Pierrepont, and Neolithic stone axes have been found in the city manufactured as far away as Great Langdale in the Lake District and Penmaenmawr in North Wales. Holme Pierrepont is also the site of the area's most impressive Stone Age monument: an early Neolithic burial monument consisting of several intercutting concentric ditches surrounding a central mound containing five shallow pits.

Abundant evidence exists of Bronze Age habitation in the area, including tools and weapons found in the River Trent and other local rivers, a flat axe found in Edwalton and a looped palstave found in Bestwood. A large hoard of Bronze Age metalwork was discovered during building works in Great Freeman Street in 1860, dating from the late 9th or 8th centuries BC and consisting of ten socketed axes, four bronze arrowheads, a palstave, a hollow ring and the base of a spear shaft. A possible Bronze Age dwelling has been discovered in Clifton, including a series of oak stakes spaced about a yard apart in the river bed of the Trent and a collection of mid and late Bronze Age metalwork including spearheads, rapiers, swords, knives and a dirk. Similar though less well preserved sites have been discovered in Attenborough and Holme Pierrepont. Cropmarks indicating the ring ditches of Bronze Age burial sites are densely distributed across the gravel terraces around the Trent in the south of the city. Excavation of these sites have revealed evidence of cremations and traces of Bronze Age pottery, including urns.

The Iron Age between 700BC and AD43 saw a significant increase in the density of settlement in the area, with evidence of a large number of farming settlements encompassing both arable and pastoral agriculture, each probably occupied by a single family group. Iron Age pottery has been found at a wide variety of sites within the city centre, including the north bailey of the Castle, Low Pavement, Fisher Gate, Halifax Place and a shallow ditch between Woolpack Lane and Barker Gate. Excavations of settlements at Gamston provided evidence of small-scale pottery and textile industries and extensive trading links, with salt from Cheshire, pottery from Charnwood Forest and querns from the Pennines. The importance of the Trent as a trade route during the period has been shown by the discovery of three dugout canoes and a spoked wheel dating from the Iron Age in the gravels at Holme Pierrepont. Iron Age ditches have been excavated at Nottingham Castle and at several sites in the Lace Market, suggesting that pre-historic fortifications in these areas are possible.

Nottingham is notable for its lack of evidence of occupation during the Roman era. Although the Fosse Way was one of Britain's major Roman roads and passed within six miles to the south of Nottingham, there is no record of any crossing of the Trent or settlement close to the site of the modern city.

After the Roman departure at around 410 AD, independent Brythonic kingdoms emerged everywhere in Britain. The Nottinghamshire area was briefly covered by the kingdom of Elmet from the late 5th century to the beginning of the 7th century.

Anglo-Saxon era
In Anglo-Saxon times, around 600 AD, the site formed part of the Kingdom of Mercia, where it may have been known as "Tig Guocobauc" (though this is only known from the later 9th-century account of the Welsh cleric Asser, active at the court of Alfred the Great) meaning in Brythonic "a place of cave dwellings", until falling under the rule of a Saxon chieftain named Snot, whereby it was dubbed "Snotingaham" literally, "the homestead of Snot's people" (Inga = the people of; Ham = homestead). Snot brought together his people in an area where the historic Lace Market in the city can now be found.

The first documentary record of Nottingham is as Snotengaham in the Anglo-Saxon Chronicle entry for 868. Names of this form normally represent settlements established in the 6th or 7th century and associated with tribal groupings, indicating that Nottingham was probably formed as the primary settlement of the Snotingas, whose wider territory would have formed a regio or administrative subdivision of the Kingdom of Mercia. Anglo-Saxon pottery from the 7th or 8th century has been found in Fisher Gate within a defensive ditch that can also be seen in Woolpack Lane and Barker Gate, suggesting the first Anglo-Saxon settlement took the form of a small defensive enclosure in this area.

The placename of Nottingham and the large amount of land in Royal ownership at the time of the Domesday Book probably indicate that the settlement was the Snotingas''' royal vill or administrative centre during the early Anglo-Saxon period. The remains of a large 8th-century timber hall situated in its own enclosure has been excavated in Halifax Place. This was later replaced by a series of three halls built further to the west, which survived until the 11th century, when they were replaced in turn by a large stone-built aisle hall. These halls all fronted the street now known as High Pavement, the main street of the Anglo-Saxon settlement, and are similar to halls excavated in Northampton known to have been palaces of Mercian Kings.

Nottingham was captured in 867 by Danish Vikings and later became one of the Five Burghs – or fortified towns – of The Danelaw.

The first Bridge over the River Trent is thought to have been constructed around 920.

11th century
Nottingham is mentioned in the 1086 Domesday Book as "Snotingeham" and "Snotingham".

In the 11th century, Nottingham Castle was constructed on a sandstone outcrop by the River Trent. The Anglo-Saxon settlement developed into the English Borough of Nottingham and housed a Town Hall and Courts. A settlement also developed around the castle on the hill opposite and was the French borough supporting the Normans in the Castle. Eventually, the space between was built on as the town grew and the Old Market Square became the focus of Nottingham several centuries later.

12th century
The construction of St Peter's Church, Nottingham started around 1180.

The construction and opening of Ye old Trip to Jerusalem was in 1132. (Attributed to be Britain's oldest Pub)

13th century
In 1264, during the Second Barons' War, rebels attacked the Jewish community of Nottingham.

In 1276, a group of Carmelite friars established a Friary on what is now Friar Lane with lands that included a guesthouse on the site of what is now The Bell Inn.

14th century
Foundation of Plumptre Hospital in 1392, Nottingham's longest serving charity.

15th century
The town became a county corporate in 1449, giving it effective self-government, in the words of the charter, "for eternity". The Castle and Shire Hall were expressly excluded and technically remained as detached Parishes of Nottinghamshire.

17th century

King Charles I of England raised the Royal Standard in Nottingham on 22 August 1642 at the start of the English Civil War.

One of the first banks in England outside London was established around 1688. Smith's Bank was in Market Square.

18th century
The Trent Navigation Company is formed in 1783 to improve navigation on the River Trent from Nottingham to Kingston upon Hull.

The Nottingham Canal opens in 1796. The price of coal in Nottingham is halved.

19th century

Coal gas was introduced in Nottinghamshire by the Nottingham Gas Light and Coke Company in 1821.

Nottingham was the first place in Britain to install high pressure constant supply mains water in 1831. This system was deployed by engineer Thomas Hawksley and the Trent Waterworks Company.

The Midland Counties Railway opened the first railway service between Nottingham and Derby on 4 June 1839.

During the Industrial Revolution, much of Nottingham's prosperity was founded on the textile industry; in particular, Nottingham was an internationally important centre of lace manufacture. However, the rapid and poorly planned growth left Nottingham with the reputation of having the worst slums in England.  the Government in 1844 appointed a Commission to look into the state of great towns. Thomas Hawkesley, Borough Water Engineer, testified to the Commission that he considered Nottingham to be the worst town in England. Residents of these slums rioted in 1831, in protest against the Duke of Newcastle's opposition to the Reform Act 1832, setting fire to his residence, Nottingham Castle. Businesses in other sectors founded in 19th-century Nottingham included the Raleigh Bicycle Company and Boots the Chemist.

Nottingham was one of the boroughs reformed by the Municipal Corporations Act 1835, and at that time consisted of the parishes of Nottingham St Mary, Nottingham St Nicholas and Nottingham St Peter. It was expanded in 1877 by adding the parishes of Basford, Brewhouse Yard, Bulwell, Radford, Sneinton, Standard Hill and parts of the parishes of West Bridgford, Carlton, Wilford (North Wilford).

The first incinerators for waste disposal were built in Nottingham by Manlove, Alliott & Co. Ltd. in 1874 to a design patented by Alfred Fryer. They were originally known as Destructors.

The first horse drawn tramcars were operated by the Nottingham and District Tramways Company Limited in 1878.

In 1889 Nottingham became a county borough under the Local Government Act 1888. City status was awarded as part of the Diamond Jubilee celebrations of Queen Victoria, being signified in a letter from the Prime Minister the Marquess of Salisbury to the Mayor, dated 18 June 1897.

The Great Central Railway opened Nottingham Victoria railway station in 1899.

20th century
Electric trams operated by Nottingham Corporation Tramways begin on 1 January 1901.

Nottingham Council House was rebuilt between 1927 and 1929 to designs by Thomas Cecil Howitt.

World War II

The Nottingham Blitz was the Nazi German Luftwaffe bombing on the city of Nottingham on the evenings of 8/9 May 1941 as part of a nationwide campaign to disrupt key industrial production, undermine morale and destroy factories, rail networks and infrastructure. During one air raid alone 140 people had been killed and 4,500 houses had been destroyed. Large areas of Nottingham and West Bridgford had been destroyed and University College Nottingham had been damaged.

Economic decline
In common with the UK textile industry as a whole, Nottingham's textile sector fell into headlong decline in the decades following the World War II, as British manufacturers proved unable to compete on price or volume with output of factories in the Far East and South Asia. Very little textile manufacture now takes place in Nottingham, but the city's heyday in this sector endowed it with some fine industrial buildings in the Lace Market district. Many of these have been restored and put to new uses.

Robin Hood

The legend of Robin Hood first arose in the Middle Ages. Robin Hood is said to have lived in Sherwood Forest, which extended from the north of Nottingham to the north side of Doncaster, Yorkshire. Although Robin Hood is generally associated with Nottingham and Nottinghamshire, some authors (e.g. Phillips & Keatman, 1995) argue that he came from Yorkshire. Hood's main adversary was the Sheriff of Nottingham. Today the office of Sheriff of Nottingham is a ceremonial position with no real jurisdiction. Whilst the accuracy of the legend is questionable, particularly the finer points, it has had a major impact on Nottingham, with Robin Hood imagery a popular choice for local businesses and many modern tourist attractions exploiting the legend. The Robin Hood Statue in Nottingham is within walking distance from the Old Market Square.

Caves of Nottingham
The Nottingham Caves have always formed an important part of the region, at first providing shelter and sanctuary, but growing to house thriving tanning works and in modern times becoming a tourist attraction. The caves are artificial, having been carved out of the soft sandstone rock by prospective dwellers, and have grown to become a complex network under the city. The oldest date back to 1250. The city has more manmade caves than anywhere else in the country and this whole cave network has Scheduled Ancient Monument protection equal to that of Stonehenge, making Nottingham Caves a site of vast importance to the heritage of the United Kingdom. Part of the network can be viewed by the public at the City of Caves attraction which is accessed from the upper mall of the Broadmarsh Shopping Centre.

Before the industrial revolution, the cave network was substantially expanded and became home to a large proportion of the poorer populace, particularly those involved in the tanning industry. The majority of the caves were thought to have been used for storage by the 18th century and were still inhabited until around 1924 when the last family (the Shore family) moved out of the caves in Ilkeston road; they came into use again as air raid shelters during World War II. A section of the cave network under the Broadmarsh Shopping Centre is now open as a tourist attraction, and some parts are still used as pub cellars.

Another section of the caves, under the castle, is still in regular use as the indoor rifle range of the Nottingham Rifle Club. In addition, Ye Olde Trip to Jerusalem Inn, a pub that claims to be the oldest in Britain, is partly built into the cave system below the castle and still retains access from the beer cellars to the castle through the cave inside castle rock. Although the pub's building only dates from the 16th or 17th century, the caves themselves may date to the 11th century and could have been the site of the brewhouse for the castle.

Nottingham Castle
Nottingham Castle, founded by William the Conqueror, famed through the Middle Ages as one of the country's finest strongholds, and where Charles I raised the Royal Standard in 1642 no longer exists, and has been replaced by a classical ducal palace. Of the mediæval castle only the (restored) gatehouse, and the ruined remains of some walls/foundations survive.

See also
 Timeline of Nottingham

 References 

Bibliography
 
 
 
 
 

Further reading
Published in the 19th century
 
 
 

Published in the 20th century
 
 
 
 Chambers, J. D. "Nottingham"History Today''(Oct 1951) 1#10 pp 40–48. 
Published in the 21st century